Up is the fourth studio album by American rock band Pop Evil. It was released on August 21, 2015 through eOne Music.

Track listing

Personnel
Leigh Kakaty – lead vocals 
Nick Fuelling – lead guitar, backing vocals 
Dave Grahs – rhythm guitar, backing vocals
Matt DiRito – bass, backing vocals 
Joshua Marunde – drums

Charts

Singles

References 

2015 albums
Pop Evil albums
E1 Music albums
Albums produced by Adam Kasper